Divo Zadi (25 January 1931 – 1 April 2021) was an Italian Roman Catholic bishop.

Zadi was born in Italy and was ordained to the priesthood in 1953. He served as bishop of the Roman Catholic Diocese of Civita Castellana, Italy, from 1989 to 2007.

References

1931 births
2021 deaths
20th-century Italian Roman Catholic bishops
21st-century Italian Roman Catholic bishops